USS James L. Davis was a bark acquired by the Union Navy during the American Civil War. She was used by the Navy to patrol navigable waterways of the Confederacy to prevent the South from trading with other countries.

Service history
James L. Davis (also called J. L. Davis), a wooden sailing vessel, was purchased at Philadelphia, Pennsylvania, 29 September 1861; and commissioned 30 December, Acting Volunteer Lieutenant Joseph Winn in command. James L. Davis departed Philadelphia 2 January 1862 for the Gulf of Mexico. James L. Davis arrived Cedar Keys, Florida, 2 March and 8 days later captured schooner Florida attempting to slip in through the blockade with a cargo of coffee, soda ash, and other supplies already in short supply in the South. After 6 months of blockade duty on the Atlantic and Gulf coasts of Florida, the bark took English schooner Isabel attempting to dash out of St. Mark's, Florida, with a cargo of cotton in late September.
 
On 2 October James L. Davis interrupted her blockade duty to serve as a supply ship, carrying stores and provisions to other vessels of the squadron. The bark continued this essential work until ordered to relieve  at St. Joseph's Bay, Florida, in March 1863. She remained at this station until ordered to Key West, Florida, for repairs 15 November. At the beginning of 1864 James L. Davis was ordered to Tampa Bay where she served until fall. During the operation the three ships cooperated in capturing blockade-running sloop Neptune with a cargo of cotton. In July and August, James L. Davis participated in a series of successful boat expeditions which destroyed salt works, a large saw and grist mill, and a sugar mill belonging to Jefferson Davis. James L. Davis was ordered to St. Joseph's Bay 1 September and served there until ordered to Key West for repairs 1 April 1865. The war ended while the bark was at Key West. She was ordered to Philadelphia 21 April where she was sold at public auction 20 June 1865.

References 

Ships of the Union Navy
Gunboats of the United States Navy
Barques of the United States Navy
American Civil War patrol vessels of the United States
Stores ships of the United States Navy